Xtalk may refer to:

 x:talk, a UK-based project for migrant sex workers
 xTalk, a family of scripting languages based on Apple's HyperTalk